Mudface may refer to:

Mudface the Giant Turtle, character in Doctor Dolittle and the Secret Lake, Doctor Dolittle's Post Office, and other stories.
Mudface (Redman album)
Mudface (Anybody Killa album)